Let Go is the debut studio album by American country music duo Brother Phelps. The duo was formed by brothers Ricky Lee and Doug Phelps, both of whom had departed the country rock band The Kentucky Headhunters in 1993. The album's debut single, which was the title track, peaked at #6 on the Billboard country charts. "Were You Really Livin'", "Eagle over Angel", and "Ever-Changing Woman" were all released as singles too. Richard Young, Fred Young, and Greg Martin of The Kentucky Headhunters co-wrote the track "Everything Will Work Out Fine."

Track listing

Personnel
Mike Brignardello – bass guitar
Sam Bush – mandolin
Larry Byrom – electric guitar
Paul Franklin – steel guitar
Jim Horn – horns
John Hughey – steel guitar
Martin Kickliter – drums
Albert Lee – electric guitar
Paul Leim – drums
Nashville String Machine – strings
Doug Phelps – background vocals, acoustic guitar, 12-string guitar, harmonica
Ricky Lee Phelps – lead vocals, tambourine
Richard Ripani – piano, Hammond organ
Billy Joe Walker, Jr. – rhythm guitar
Glenn Worf – bass guitar

Charts

1993 debut albums
Asylum Records albums
Brother Phelps albums